Adolf Bachura (10 April 1933 – 25 April 2017) was an Austrian ice hockey player. He competed in the men's tournament at the 1964 Winter Olympics.

References

1933 births
2017 deaths
Austrian ice hockey players
Olympic ice hockey players of Austria
Ice hockey players at the 1964 Winter Olympics
Ice hockey people from Vienna
20th-century Austrian people